"Vintage 74" is the fourth studio album by Sérgio Mendes and Brasil ‘77. This is the second album to feature vocals by Gracinha Leporace and Bonnie Bowden.

Track listing
"Don't You Worry 'Bout A Thing" (Stevie Wonder) - 3:36
"This Masquerade" (Leon Russell) - 4:36
"The Waters Of March (Aguas De Março)" (Antonio Carlos Jobim) - 3:56
"Waiting For Love" (Randy McNeill) - 4:18
"Lonely Sailor (Marinheiro Só)" - 3:16
"Você Abusou" (Antonio Carlos, Jocafi) - 3:57
"Superstition" (Stevie Wonder) - 5:54
"Funny You Should Say That" (Brian Potter, Dennis Lambert) - 3:24
"Double Rainbow" (Antonio Carlos Jobim, Gene Lees) - 3:22
"If You Really Love Me" (Stevie Wonder, Syreeta Wright) - 3:28

Personnel
Acoustic Guitar – Antônio Carlos Jobim (tracks 3, 9), Oscar Castro-Neves (tracks 1, 2, 4, 5, 6, 8, 9, 10)
Arranged By [Rhythm] – Sérgio Mendes (tracks 2, 3, 5, 6, 7, 9)
Arranged By [Rhythm], Arranged By [Vocals] – Bob Alcivar (tracks 1, 4, 8, 10)
Art Direction – Beverly Weinstein
Artwork [Back Cover Painting] – Wesley Duke Lee
Bass – Joe Osborn (tracks 1, 2, 4, 8, 10), Octavio Bailly, Jr. (tracks 3, 5, 6, 7, 9)
Conductor [Orchestra], Arranged By [Orchestra] – Dave Grusin
Congas – Laudir de Oliveira (tracks 7, 9), Paulinho da Costa (credited as "Paulo Da Costa") (tracks 1, 5, 8, 10)
Coordinator [Production] – Pamela Vale
Design – David Larkham, Ron Wong
Drums – Claudio Slon
Electric Guitar – Dennis Budimir (track 1, 4, 5, 8, 9, 10)
Electric Piano – Sérgio Mendes (tracks: 3, 5, 7, 9, 10)
Engineer [Second] – Geoff Howe
Ganzá – Paulinho da Costa (credited as "Paulo Da Costa") (tracks 2, 3, 10)
Mastered By – John Golden
Photography By – Ed Caraeff
Piano – Sérgio Mendes (tracks 1, 2, 4, 6, 8)
Producer, Engineer [Sound] – Bones Howe
Shaker – Paulinho da Costa (credited as "Paulo Da Costa")  (tracks 7, 8)
Synthesizer – Sérgio Mendes (tracks 1, 2, 9)
Twelve-string Guitar – David Amaro (tracks 2, 4)
 Vocals – Bonnie Bowden (tracks 2, 4, 7, 8, 9, 10), Gracinha Leporace (tracks: 5, 6)

References

1974 albums
Sérgio Mendes albums
Albums conducted by Dave Grusin
Albums arranged by Dave Grusin
Albums produced by Bones Howe
Bell Records albums